Fotbal Club Olimpia MCMXXI Satu Mare, commonly known as Olimpia Satu Mare or simply as Olimpia, is a Romanian professional football club from Satu Mare, Satu Mare County, Romania, founded on 5 May 1921, re-founded in 2010 and 2018. The club played in the Liga I in the following seasons: 1937–38, 1974–75, 1975–76, 1977–78, 1978–79, 1979–80 and 1998–99.

Chronology of names

History 
The club was founded in 1921. In 1934, the club reached the quarter finals of the first ever Romanian Cup. Olimpia was placed in Liga 1 after the Romanian league system was re-structured in 1936, but the team relegated before long. After World War II, the club faced various financial challenges and did not make an appearance in Divizia A until 1974. Olimpia reached the final of the Romanian Cup in 1978 and lost to a strong Universitatea Craiova team 3–1. After two years, the team returns to Divizia B, where he was among the leaders of the series, until 1993 when it was relegated to Divizia C after a scandal.

Two years later, Olimpia returns to Divizia B and in 1998 it promoted to Divizia A, but it immediately relegated. The team was then a regular Divizia B presence, with no notable performances, the maximum reached was a 4th place at the end of the 2004–05 season. In 2006, the team relegated to Liga III where it had disastrous results, saving from relegation in the last moment for the next two seasons, then the club was relegated to Liga IV due to financial problems and reached the brink of collapse even suffering a major reorganization in 2010.

In 2011 the team won Liga IV-Satu Mare and then the play-off match against Meseșul Treznea Sălaj County champions, with an imposing score, 6–0. The match was played in Oradea on Iuliu Bodola Stadium and Oli was encouraged by its groups of supporters Commando Oli and Sezione Ostile and by Bihor Oradea supporters, Peluza Nord Oradea.
At the end of 2011–12 Liga III season, Olimpia finished only second, at 3 points distance from Corona Brașov, but promoted the next season with an advance of 5 points over FC Hunedoara. Then Olimpia becoming again a regular Liga II team, the best performance being 5th place, obtained at the end of 2014–15 season.

In the winter break of the 2017–18 season, Olimpia withdrew from Liga II due to financial problems, also having 70 points deducted. In the same time, the local authorities founded CSM Satu Mare, a new entity that pretend to be the successor of FC Olimpia, but has no legal connections with the old club. After this second dissolution, supporters, organized as Voluntarii Olimpiști (Olimpia's Volunteers), dissatisfied with the way the club has been administered in recent years, have created their own club, Olimpia MCMXXI, a fan-owned phoenix club inspired by models such as: ASU Politehnica Timișoara, LSS Voința Sibiu or FC Argeș 1953 Pitești. This club also pretend to be the successor of FC Olimpia, but again, were not legal connection between the old entity and this new one. In recent years, other football clubs from Romania were also refounded by their supporters, but subsequently were recognized as the official successors of the original clubs, among them: Petrolul Ploiești or Oțelul Galați.

In 2021, Olimpia MCMXXI won "FC Olimpia Satu Mare" brand and became the official successor of the old entity.

Stadium 
Olimpia Satu Mare used to play its home matches on Daniel Prodan Stadium in Satu Mare, which has a capacity of 18,000. After its second re-foundation, in 2018, due to the conflict between supporters and local authorities, Olimpia started to play its home matches on Someșul Stadium in Satu Mare, with a capacity of 6,000 people. On Daniel Prodan Stadium started to play CSM Satu Mare, the club financially supported by the local authorities.

Supporters
Olimpia has many supporters in Satu Mare and especially in Satu Mare County. The ultras groups of Olimpia Satu Mare are known as Commando Oli and Sezione Ostile. From 2015 the two groups merged and formed Peluza Olimpia 1921. Olimpia supporters consider Bihor Oradea supporters to be their allies, fans of both teams had the opportunity to support the other during matches.

Honours

Leagues 
Liga II
Winners (3): 1973–74, 1976–77, 1997–98
Runners-up (2): 1935–36, 1980–81
Liga III
Winners (2): 1968–69, 2012–13
Runners-up (2): 1994–95, 2011–12
Liga IV – Satu Mare County
Winners (2): 2010–11
Champions League 5 x

Cups 
Cupa României
Runners-up (1): 1977–78

Other performances 
Appearances in Liga I: 7
Best finish in Liga I: Quarterfinalist in 1926–27 and 9th place in 1974–75
Place 42 of 98 teams in Liga I All-time table
The most successful team from Satu Mare County

Notable former managers 
  József Kiprich
  Stefan Zobromovich

League history

References 

Association football clubs established in 1921
Association football clubs disestablished in 2018
Defunct football clubs in Romania
Football clubs in Satu Mare County
Satu Mare
Liga I clubs
Liga II clubs
Liga III clubs
Liga IV clubs
1921 establishments in Romania
2018 disestablishments in Romania